Loosu is a village in Võru Parish, Võru County in southeastern Estonia. It has a population of 195.

See also
Lake Loosu

References

Villages in Võru County
Võru Parish